Radial Road 6 is the sixth radial road in Metro Manila, in the Philippines. It passes through the cities of Manila, Quezon City, San Juan, Pasig, and Marikina, as well as Cainta, and Antipolo in the province of Rizal up to Santa Maria, Laguna and Infanta, Quezon

Parts and Intersections of the R-6 Road

Legarda Street

R-6 includes the segment of Legarda Street from its intersection with Recto Avenue (C-1) and Mendiola Street, to the Nagtahan Interchange.

Magsaysay Boulevard

Magsaysay Boulevard is a 6-8 lane main road in Manila. It starts at the Nagtahan Interchange in Manila and ends at the intersection with Gregorio Araneta Avenue (C-3) in Quezon City. It was formerly part of the "Manila Provincial Road" and called as the " Santa Mesa Boulevard".

Aurora Boulevard

Aurora Boulevard is a 4-6 lane avenue in Quezon City and San Juan. Aurora Boulevard is one of the two roads that form the majority portion of the Radial Road 6 (R-6) in Metro Manila, passing through the cities of Quezon City and San Juan. Its western endpoint is at the border between Manila and Quezon City and its northern terminus is at the intersection between Katipunan Avenue or at the C-5 Road. The avenue was a former portion of a highway connecting Manila to Infanta in Quezon which was called as the "Manila Provincial Road" and was subsequently upgraded into one of Metro Manila's major thoroughfare which was renamed after President Manuel L. Quezon's Wife and Former First Lady, Aurora Quezon.

Marcos Highway (Marikina-Infanta Highway)

The road becomes the Marcos Highway (Marikina–Infanta Highway) after crossing the Katipunan Avenue (C-5). The portion of Marcos Highway that is a part of the Radial Road 6 is from the Katipunan Avenue up to Famy-Real-Infanta Road in Infanta, Quezon.

See also
 List of roads in Metro Manila

Routes in Metro Manila